Dynamic frequency scaling (also known as CPU throttling) is a power management technique in computer architecture whereby the frequency of a microprocessor can be automatically adjusted "on the fly" depending on the actual needs, to conserve power and reduce the amount of heat generated by the chip. Dynamic frequency scaling helps preserve battery on mobile devices and decrease cooling cost and noise on quiet computing settings, or can be useful as a security measure for overheated systems (e.g. after poor overclocking).

Dynamic frequency scaling almost always appear in conjunction with dynamic voltage scaling, since higher frequencies require higher supply voltages for the digital circuit to yield correct results. The combined topic is known as dynamic voltage and frequency scaling (DVFS).

Processor throttling is also known as "automatic underclocking". Automatic overclocking (boosting) is also technically a form of dynamic frequency scaling, but it's relatively new and usually not discussed with throttling.

Operation 

The dynamic power (switching power) dissipated by a chip is C·V2·A·f, where C is the capacitance being switched per clock cycle, V is voltage, A is the Activity Factor indicating the average number of switching events per clock cycle by the transistors in the chip (as a unitless quantity) and f is the clock frequency.

Voltage is therefore the main determinant of power usage and heating. The voltage required for stable operation is determined by the frequency at which the circuit is clocked, and can be reduced if the frequency is also reduced. Dynamic power alone does not account for the total power of the chip, however, as there is also static power, which is primarily because of various leakage currents. Due to static power consumption and asymptotic execution time it has been shown that the energy consumption of software shows convex energy behavior, i.e., there exists an optimal CPU frequency at which energy consumption is minimized.
Leakage current has become more and more important as transistor sizes have become smaller and threshold voltage levels are reduced. A decade ago, dynamic power accounted for approximately two-thirds of the total chip power. The power loss due to leakage currents in contemporary CPUs and SoCs tend to dominate the total power consumption. In the attempt to control the leakage power, high-k metal-gates and power gating have been common methods.

Dynamic voltage scaling is another related power conservation technique that is often used in conjunction with frequency scaling, as the frequency that a chip may run at is related to the operating voltage.

The efficiency of some electrical components, such as voltage regulators, decreases with increasing temperature, so the power usage may increase with temperature.  Since increasing power use may increase the temperature, increases in voltage or frequency may increase system power demands even further than the CMOS formula indicates, and vice versa.

Performance impact
Dynamic frequency scaling reduces the number of instructions a processor can issue in a given amount of time, thus reducing performance. Hence, it is generally used when the workload is not CPU-bound.

Dynamic frequency scaling by itself is rarely worthwhile as a way to conserve switching power.  Saving the highest possible amount of power requires dynamic voltage scaling too, because of the V2 component and the fact that modern CPUs are strongly optimized for low power idle states.  In most constant-voltage cases, it is more efficient to run briefly at peak speed and stay in a deep idle state for longer time (called "race to idle" or computational sprinting), than it is to run at a reduced clock rate for a long time and only stay briefly in a light idle state.  However, reducing voltage along with clock rate can change those trade-offs.

A related-but-opposite technique is overclocking, whereby processor performance is increased by ramping the processor's (dynamic) frequency beyond the manufacturer's design specifications.

One major difference between the two is that in modern PC systems overclocking is mostly done over the Front Side Bus (mainly because the multiplier is normally locked), but dynamic frequency scaling is done with the multiplier.  Moreover, overclocking is often static, while dynamic frequency scaling is always dynamic.  Software can often incorporate overclocked frequencies into the frequency scaling algorithm, if the chip degradation risks are allowable.

Support across vendors

Intel 
Intel's CPU throttling technology, SpeedStep, is used in its mobile and desktop CPU lines.

AMD 
AMD employs two different CPU throttling technologies. AMD's Cool'n'Quiet technology is used on its desktop and server processor lines.  The aim of Cool'n'Quiet is not to save battery life, as it is not used in AMD's mobile processor line, but instead with the purpose of producing less heat, which in turn allows the system fan to spin down to slower speeds, resulting in cooler and quieter operation, hence the name of the technology.  AMD's PowerNow! CPU throttling technology is used in its mobile processor line, though some supporting CPUs like the AMD K6-2+ can be found in desktops as well.

AMD PowerTune and AMD ZeroCore Power are dynamic frequency scaling technologies for GPUs.

VIA Technologies 
VIA Technologies processors use a technology named LongHaul (PowerSaver), while Transmeta's version was called LongRun.

The 36-processor AsAP 1 chip is among the first multi-core processor chips to support completely unconstrained clock operation (requiring only that frequencies are below the maximum allowed) including arbitrary changes in frequency, starts, and stops.  The 167-processor AsAP 2 chip is the first multi-core processor chip which enables individual processors to make fully unconstrained changes to their own clock frequencies.

According to the ACPI Specs, the C0 working state of a modern-day CPU can be divided into the so-called "P"-states (performance states) which allow clock rate reduction and "T"-states (throttling states) which will further throttle down a CPU (but not the actual clock rate) by inserting STPCLK (stop clock) signals and thus omitting duty cycles.

ARM 
Different ARM-based systems on chip provide CPU and GPU throttling.

See also 
 Dynamic voltage scaling
 Clock gating
 HLT (x86 instruction)
Power Saving Technologies:
 AMD Cool'n'Quiet (desktop CPUs)
 AMD PowerNow! (laptop CPUs)
 AMD PowerTune/AMD PowerPlay (graphics)
 Intel SpeedStep (CPUs)
Performance Boosting Technologies:
 AMD Turbo Core (CPUs)
 Intel Turbo Boost (CPUs)

References

Clock signal
Energy conservation
Central processing unit
Computer hardware tuning